Gjevillvatnet (or Gjevilvatnet) is a lake in the municipality of Oppdal in Trøndelag county, Norway.

The lake was regulated for hydroelectric power-production in the 1970s. Water is tapped from the bottom in the western part of the lake, for use in the Driva power station. The river Festa runs out of the lake Gjevillvatnet, and it was once a very good trout river from where the lake is now, all the way down to the intake dam at the old powerstation (Vardammen). This river now mostly runs dry every year due to the dam on Gjevillvatnet, and the trout are almost non-existent in the watercourse.

The Gjevilvass valley is still regarded as one of Norway's most scenic valleys, and a cruise boat runs on the lake during summer. Along the middle of the lake, lies the Gjevillvasshytta, a lodge owned by Trondheim Turistforening. Here guests can eat, sleep, and use the lodge as a starting point for walking trips in the Trollheimen mountains.

See also
List of lakes in Norway

References

Oppdal
Lakes of Trøndelag
Reservoirs in Norway